Gangwon Provincial University is a public college in Gangneung City, Gangwon Province, South Korea.  Unlike most public tertiary institutions in South Korea, it is administered directly by the provincial government of Gangwon-do.
The college is well known as a research and educational institute with modern facilities.

Campus
The college is located in Jumunjin-eup, north of Gangneung's city center.  It lies close to the Yeongdong Expressway.
Situated between the Taebaek mountain range and the eastern coastline, the campus enjoys easy access to the waters of the Sea of Japan as well as Jumunjin Harbor. There have been several additions to the campus in recent years, including a professional turf soccer field as well as an outdoor performance theater.

History
Permission to establish the college was granted in 1995, and construction began in 1997. The first students were admitted in March 1998. In 2015, an evaluation by the Ministry of Education rated the college in the lowest E group, resulting in the Ministry halting its monetary support and barring the college from all state-funded programs.

Organization
The president of GPU reports directly to the governor of Gangwon Province.  The president oversees the college's four divisions:  Natural Science, Engineering, Human and Social Science, and Physical Education. Under these four divisions, there are a total of 13 departments.

Marine Police & Technology, Marine Life Sciences, Food Processing & Bakery,
Cadastral Science & Real Estate, Tourism, Child Education & Care, Civil Engineering, Information & Communication,
Automotive Engineering, Industrial Design, Fire-Environmental & Disaster Prevention, Digital Contents Techniques,
Leisure Sports.

Students and faculty
As of February 2010, the school has about 1,400 students, 33 full-time professors, 13 adjunct professors and over 90 part-time lecturers.
A total of about 3,500 students had graduated from the school, as of 2010.

Cooperation with local community

GPC has, since its inception, worked together with the local community.
The campus itself is open to the general public, and the school's departments have closely linked with local industries.
For example, the college has a leading role in establishing a ‘Jumunjin Brand Squid’, whose name ‘Jumunjingeo’ combines the name of the town as well as the Korean word for fish. 
In Jumunjin, the most well known marine animal is squid.

See also
List of national universities in South Korea
List of universities and colleges in South Korea
Education in Korea
Kangwon National University

References

External links
 Official website, in Korean

Universities and colleges in Gangwon Province, South Korea
Gangneung
Public universities and colleges in South Korea